Parascorpis typus, the jutjaw, is a species of perciform fish, the only known member of its genus and family. It is native to the Indian Ocean coast of Africa where it is known to occur along the coasts of Mozambique and South Africa. This species grows to a length of  TL. This species is considered to be a good foodfish, but they are currently not sought out by commercial fisheries and are caught only rarely by anglers.

References

Parascorpididae
Fish described in 1875
Monotypic fish genera
Fish of Mozambique